James Drummond Anderson may refer to:

James Drummond Anderson (1852–1920), member of the Indian Civil Service
James Drummond Anderson (1886–1968), his son, financial governor of the Punjab

See also
James Anderson (disambiguation)